Sam Fisher may refer to:

Sam Fisher (Australian footballer) (born 1982), Australian rules footballer for St Kilda
Sam Fisher (Scottish footballer) (born 2001), association football player for Dundee